Boxford railway station was a railway station in Boxford, Berkshire, UK, on the Lambourn Valley Railway.
The hut has been saved from being destroyed as a disused bus shelter and is now being restored by the GWSR for use on their site.

History 
The station opened on 4 April 1898.  It was staffed until 1954; between 1904 and 1940 it was overseen by Charlie Brown, a local man employed by the Great Western Railway.

The station had few passenger facilities, and dealt primarily with small goods. Boxford was the first stop on the line with a siding, which also functioned as a passing loop.

The station closed to all traffic in 1960. The station's wooden shelter is now used as a bus shelter in the village.

References 

Lambourn Valley Railway
Disused railway stations in Berkshire
Former Great Western Railway stations
Railway stations in Great Britain opened in 1898
Railway stations in Great Britain closed in 1960